Alfonso Yanga Miranda Jr. (born February 7, 1976), widely known as Chito Miranda, is a Filipino singer-songwriter and occasional actor, best known as one of the founding members and lead singer for the band Parokya ni Edgar.

Early life and career

Miranda attended grade school and high school at the Ateneo de Manila University where he met Gab Chee Kee, Vinci Montaner, Jeric Estaco, and Mikko Yap. They formed a garage band during their high school years.

The group was known in school to be class clowns. Normally in shows, they would show up in women’s clothing to entertain victims of earthquakes and typhoons and sing off-key in poetry readings.

They eventually landed the role of front act band for the locally well-known Filipino alternative rock band Eraserheads. Later on, childhood friend Buwi Meneses and schoolmate Dindin Moreno joined as bassist and drummer, respectively. When they graduated high school, Estaco and Yap decided to leave the group to pursue other interests. Shortly thereafter, Darius Semaña (lead guitar), Meneses's former bandmate, joined to complete the sextet.

Originally, Parokya ni Edgar was called 'Comic Relief'. However, they decided to change the name in homage to a Noli me tangere joke in their student days.

Later on, Parokya ni Edgar performed regularly in Club Dredd, one of the famous clubs in Manila during that time. The band slowly gained popularity during the height of the Filipino rock explosion, with the local rock community opening up to the influence of foreign grunge acts such as Nirvana, Pearl Jam and Soundgarden.

Eventually, the late managing director of Universal Records, Bella Dy Tan and Alexis Tan signed them as contract artists after witnessing one of their performances at Club Dredd. The band garnered a triple platinum award for their first album Khangkhungkherrnitz.

Personal life

Relationships and lifestyle 
Miranda is good friends with fellow Filipino artists Kamikazee vocalist Jay Contreras, and rappers Gloc-9 and the late Francis Magalona. Miranda is a member of the Alpha Kappa Rho fraternity in Ateneo de Manila University batch 1994. Miranda is also notable amongst the public as a fishing and shooting sports enthusiast. Known to be a heavy smoker since high school, Miranda quit smoking after undergoing an executive health check-up in late 2013.

Miranda was in a relationship with actress Kaye Abad which lasted until 2009. In 2014, Miranda married actress Neri Naig twice: in a civil ceremony on December 13 and in a formal wedding in Tagaytay the following day. In August 2015, Miranda confirmed that Naig had suffered from a miscarriage, which would have been their first child. On June 19, 2016 Father's Day in the Philippines Miranda announced that he and Naig were expecting a child again. Their first child, a son, was born in November 2016. Their second child, also a son, was born in October 2021. As of December 2021, the couple are also in the process of officially adopting a girl who is Naig's niece.

Discography

With Parokya ni Edgar
 Khangkhungkherrnitz (1996)
 Buruguduystunstugudunstuy (1997)
 Jingle Balls Silent Night Holy Cow (1998)
 Gulong Itlog Gulong (1999)
 Edgar Edgar Musikahan (2002)
 Bigotilyo (2003)
 Halina Sa Parokya (2005)
 Solid (2007)
 Middle-Aged Juvenile Novelty Pop Rockers (2010)
 Pogi Years Old (2016)
 Borbolen (2021)

As a featured artist
 "Ligaw" with Moonstar88 (2012)
 "Diwata" with Abra (2014)
 "XGF" with Sponge Cola (2012)

Collaboration
 "Hosanna Ngayong Pasko" (1998) – with Ely Buendia
 "The Ordertaker" (2005) – with Kamikazee
 "Panahon Naman ng Harana" (2014) – with Rico Blanco
 "Swimming Pool" (2021) – with Ben&Ben

Filmography

Movies
Coming Soon (2013)

Television
Idol Philippines (season 2)

References 

1976 births
Ateneo de Manila University alumni
21st-century Filipino male singers
Musicians from Manila
Living people
20th-century Filipino male singers